Vladimir Viktorovich Kolesov (10 April 1934 – 15 May 2019) was a Soviet and Russian linguist. He was a specialist in phonology, accentology, historical grammar and lexicography, philosophy of language and history of linguistics. Doctor of Philological Sciences (1969), Full Professor (1973), Honorary Professor of St. Petersburg State University (2018). Professor and Head of the Department of the Russian Language of the Faculty of Philology of St. Petersburg State University (1979‒2006).

Biography 
In 1957 he graduated from the Faculty of Russian Language and Literature of Leningrad State University. In 1960, he also completed postgraduate studies there under the advisor of Maria Sokolova and in 1962 defended his thesis for the degree of Candidate of Philological Sciences on the topic “On the historical phonetics of Novgorod dialects”. In 1969, at the Leningrad State University, he defended his dissertation for the degree of Doctor of Philological Sciences on the topic “Nominal accentuation in the Old Russian language”.

In 1962‒1964 he was an Assistant, in 1964‒1971 he became an Associate Professor and since 1971 he has been a Full Professor. In 1978‒2006 he was the Head of the Department of the Russian Language of St. Petersburg State University. In 1966 he was awarded the academic title of Associate Professor, in 1973 the academic title of Full Professor.

Research activity 
Author of more than 500 works of various genres. He consistently polemized with the Moscow School of Historians of the Russian language (Andrey Zaliznyak, Vladimir Uspensky, Viktor Zhivov, etc.).

Awards and prizes 
  Medal “Veteran of Labour”
  Honoured Science Worker of the Russian Federation

Monographs

Notes

Bibliography

Links 
 A website dedicated to the life and work of V. V. Kolesov.
Biographical sketch
 Department of the Russian Language of the Faculty of Philology and Arts of St. Petersburg State University

1934 births
2019 deaths
Linguists from Russia
Linguists from the Soviet Union
20th-century linguists
Linguists of Russian
21st-century linguists
Writers from Saint Petersburg